V357 Carinae (a Car, a Carinae) is an astrometric and spectroscopic binary in the constellation Carina.  It is approximately 419 light years from Earth.  The mean apparent magnitude of the system is +3.43.

Location
The star appears 46.0' (0.7668°) ENE of Iota Carinae at the heart of the asterism and constellation which is skewed in having bulk of the stars away from the eastern, Canopus prow of the ship and close to the imagined sails of the ship, Vela.

Variability

V357 Carinae is a probable variable star; its brightness varies from magnitude +3.41 to +3.44 with a period of 6.74 days, which is its orbital period.  It was classified as an eclipsing binary in Gaposchkin's original catalogue of variable stars, although the variability was often considered doubtful.  It is now thought most likely to be a very shallow eclipsing binary.

System
V357 Carinae is an astrometric binary, meaning its motion in the sky implies orbital motion about an invisible companion.  It is also a single-lined spectroscopic binary, and possibly a triple system.  The two closest components orbit each other in 6.74 days, while the observed astrometric motion is much longer.

Notes

References

Carinae, a
B-type subgiants
Carina (constellation)
Eclipsing binaries
Spectroscopic binaries
Carinae, V357
079351
3659
045080
Durchmusterung objects